The 2011 Uzbekistan Cup was the 19th season of the annual Uzbek football Cup competition. The competition started on April 17, 2011 and ended on November 13, 2011 with the final that was held at the Pakhtakor Markaziy Stadium in Tashkent. Bunyodkor were the defending champions.

The cup winner were guaranteed a place in the 2012 AFC Champions League.

Calendar

First round

Bracket

Round of 32

The draw for the Round of 32 was held on 24 February 2011 at Uzbek Football Federation office in Tashkent.

The one leg matches were played on 29 and 30 April.

|}

Round of 16

First leg matches were played on 6–7, 24 May and 4 June. Second leg matches were played on 24, 25 and 27 June. Match between FC Erkurgan Koson and Bunyodkor was played on 6 June 2011 with 1:1 draw.

|}

Quarter-final

|}

First leg

Second leg

Semifinal

|}

First leg

Second leg

Final

References

Cup
Uzbekistan Cup
2011